"We Care a Lot" is a song by Faith No More. There are three versions of the song, all of which have been officially released over three different albums. The original was recorded for and released on the band's first studio album, We Care a Lot. A re-recorded version, with new lyrics, was included on the album Introduce Yourself and was the lead single, reaching number 53 on the UK Singles Chart. The live version, without original singer Chuck Mosley, was included on the live album and video Live at the Brixton Academy and was also released as a single in 1991. It was the second most frequently-played song during the band's live performances, behind "Epic". "We Care a Lot" featured different lyrics and ad-libs when performed by Mike Patton, much like performances of "Chinese Arithmetic".

Production 
The original version of the song was one of the first five songs finished for We Care a Lot, recorded before the band received financial backing for the album at Prairie Sun Studios, Cotati, California, and was re-recorded, with some updated lyrics, for their major label début Introduce Yourself in mid-1986 at Studio D, Sausalito, California.

Lyrical content 
Music sample:

The lyrics of the song are a sarcastic parody of charity concerts such as Live Aid, especially "the popstar posing that accompanied those charitable events", according to Steve Huey of AllMusic. The song lists a range of things about which the band sarcastically claims "we care a lot", such as the LAPD, the "food that Live Aid bought", the Garbage Pail Kids and even The Transformers. The original version, released in 1985, mentions Madonna and Mr. T. This was altered for social relevance in the 1987 re-release. When asked about the song's meaning, Chuck Mosley replied:

There was a seven-second-long ad-lib of "You Got It (The Right Stuff)" by New Kids on the Block on The Real Thing-era live performances, including the Live at the Brixton Academy version.

Music video 
The music video produced for "We Care a Lot", directed by Bob Biggs and Jay Brown, was the first video produced for a Faith No More song and received moderate airplay on MTV.

Appearances 

As well as the appearing on the albums We Care a Lot, Introduce Yourself and Live at the Brixton Academy the song has appeared on every compilation and video album released by the band and has three different cover versions on the tribute to Faith No More compilation album Tribute of the Year. It appeared in the movie Grosse Pointe Blank, and was also the seventh track on the first volume of movie's two soundtracks. The bridge of the song is also used as the theme to the Discovery Channel program Dirty Jobs (except for a few months in 2007), and is referenced in the opening of the song "Cats, Sex, and Nazis" by the Canadian punk band NoMeansNo, from their album Why Do They Call Me Mr. Happy?. The song was later made available as a download for the PlayStation 3 and Xbox 360 versions of the music video game Rock Band on February 5, 2008, and for Wii and PlayStation 2 versions on the Rock Band Track Pack: Volume 1, released on July 15, 2008. The song was also used in the movie Bio-Dome.

Members 
 Chuck Mosley - vocals
 Roddy Bottum - keyboards
 Billy Gould - bass guitar
 Jim Martin - guitar
 Mike Bordin - drums

Critical reception 
Allmusic's reviewer laments the song's lack of future front-man Mike Patton, calling Mosley's vocals "brute thuggishness" and "flat", but also says that the song is a "fully realized effort in itself". "We Care a Lot" was also listed in PopMatters' 65 Great Protest Songs, citing it as Faith No More's anti-protest song and as a "smirking account of everything that pop and political culture shoved down our throats at the height of the Reagan revolution".

Track listings

Charts

Covers
 MC Hammer's 1990 song "Pray" interpolates "We Care a Lot".
 Chuck Mosley recorded the song for his 2009 album Will Rap Over Hard Rock for Food with keyboardist Roddy Bottum. Mosley changed lyrics in the verses, including a nod to his former band's biggest hit "Epic" with the lyric, "We care a lot about the guy who wanted it all but couldn't have it."
 Grant Kirkhope, co-composer of the soundtrack to the hit Nintendo 64 video game Goldeneye 007 stated on an episode of the Let's Play series Game Grumps that the music on the 'Frigate' level borrowed elements of the song, as well as the Duran Duran song "A View to a Kill".
 Red Hot Chili Peppers covered a portion of it at a 2014 concert in Brooklyn.

References

Faith No More songs
1988 singles
1991 singles
Songs written by Billy Gould
Songs written by Roddy Bottum
Songs written by Chuck Mosley
1985 songs
Slash Records singles
List songs